Nirnayam is a 2013 Indian Tamil drama film written and directed by Srisaravanan and produced by music composer V. Selvaganesh. The film features Vikram Anand, Regina Cassandra and Baby Vedhika in the lead roles, with Saranya and Harris Moosa playing other pivotal characters. The film opened to mixed reviews upon release on 18 October 2013.

Cast
 Raana Vikram as Mukundan
 Regina Cassandra as Jeni
 Baby Vedhika as Meera
 Saranya as Simran
 Harris Moosa
 VK Raghunath

Production
The film was initially titled as Thaedel and was announced as a joint production venture of music composer V. Selvaganesh and director Saravanan in June 2012.

Soundtrack 
The audio of Nirnayam was held at Satyam Cinemas in Chennai on 14 February 2013 with the soundtrack being released by Vikku Vinayakram and received by director K. S. Ravikumar.

Release
The film opened to mixed reviews from critics. A critic from the Times of India noted "The plot also goes haywire towards the end when Mukund's secret is discovered, and the climax is logically shaky." The New Indian Express noted "It was a knot with potential. But if only it had more consistency in its feel, and was crisper in its narration."

References

External links
 

2013 films
2010s Tamil-language films